The 2015–16 season of the Schleswig-Holstein-Liga, the highest association football league in the German state of Schleswig-Holstein, was the eighth season of the league at tier five (V) of the German football league system.

The season began on 31 July 2015 and finished on 21 May 2016, interrupted by a winter break from 5 December to 20 February.

2015–16 standings 										
The 2015–16 season saw five new clubs in the league, FC Kilia Kiel, TSB Flensburg, Oldenburger SV and SG Reher-Puls, all four promoted from the Verbandsligas while VfR Neumünster was relegated from the Regionalliga Nord.				

Of the Schleswig-Holstein-Liga teams only SV Eichede, Eutin 08 and TSB Flensburg applied for a Regionalliga licence for the 2016–17 season, with the Northern German Football Association deciding on 9 May 2016 to grant all applicants a licence.

Top goalscorers
The top goal scorers for the season:

Promotion play-off
Promotion play-off were to be held at the end of the season to the Regionalliga Nord. The runners-up of the Niedersachsenliga and the champions or, in Hamburg's case, the only team applying for a licence, of the Bremen-Liga, Oberliga Hamburg and Schleswig-Holstein-Liga played each other for two more spot in the Regionalliga. In the promotion round each team met the other just once with the two highest-placed teams in the final table promoted:

References

External links 
 Schleswig-Holstein-Liga on Fupa.net 

Schleswig-Holstein-Liga
Schleswig